Sir Henry Halford Vaughan, or Harry (27 August 1811 – 19 April 1885), was an English historian, the Regius Professor of History at Oxford University, from 1848 to 1858.  He was the son of Sir John Vaughan (1769–1839). In 1856 he married Adeline Maria Jackson (1831–1881), eldest sister of Julia Jackson. Two years later he retired to Upton Castle in Pembrokeshire. Their son was the educationalist William Wyamar Vaughan.

Selected works
Two general lectures on modern history: delivered on inauguration, October, 1849, 1849
Welsh proverbs with English translations, 1889
British Reason in English Rhyme, 1889

Further reading

External links 
Royal College of Physicians entry for Janet Vaughan

1811 births
1885 deaths
Regius Professors of History (University of Oxford)